Uske pantalone (Tight Pants) is the sixth studio album by Yugoslavian pop-folk singer Lepa Brena and her band Slatki Greh. It was released 27 November 1986 through the record label PGP-RTB.

This was her seventh of twelve albums with Slatki Greh.

The album was sold in a circulation of 600,000 copies.

Track listing

Personnel

Production and recording
Zoran Radetić – engineering
Zoran Vukčević – engineering

Crew
Ivan Ćulum – design
Belmondo/Dragan Timotijević – photography

References

1986 albums
Lepa Brena albums
PGP-RTB albums
Serbo-Croatian language albums